Worcester Square station is a street-level bus station on the Washington Street branch of the MBTA Silver Line bus rapid transit service. It is located on Washington Street at Worcester Square in the South End neighborhood of Boston, Massachusetts near the Boston Medical Center. The stop is served by the SL4 and SL5 Silver Line routes as well as several local MBTA bus routes. Like all Silver Line stops, Worcester Square is accessible.

Silver Line service on Washington Street began on July 20, 2002, replacing the route 49 bus. Worcester Square, which had been a stop for route 49, was not initially served by the Silver Line; it became a Silver Line stop on November 30, 2002. Shelters were added later. Service levels doubled on October 15, 2009, with the introduction of the SL4 route.

References

External links

MBTA: Washington St @ Worcester St northbound and southbound

Silver Line (MBTA) stations